Dahua may refer to:

 Dahua railway station, New Taipei, Taiwan
 Dahua Subdistrict, Jinping District, Shantou, Guangdong, China
 Dahua Technology
 Dahua Yao Autonomous County, Guangxi, China
 United Overseas Bank, also known as Dahua Bank